Sarah Campbell is a textile designer who after studying painting and graphics at Chelsea School of Art, worked with her sister Susan Collier at the Liberty department store in London. In 1979, both sisters established their own company 'Collier Campbell', which in 1984 won the Duke of Edinburgh's designer prize. Four years later, they were commissioned by Conran to design the carpets of Gatwick Airport's North Terminal.

References

External links 

 Official website

Living people
British textile designers
Year of birth missing (living people)